Almyrida is a seaside resort village located in the Apokoronas region of the northwest coast of the island of Crete, Greece. The village is approximately 20 kilometers from Chania, in the Chania regional unit. Traditionally a fishing village, Almyrida has a long beach.

References 

 

Populated places in Chania (regional unit)